Andrzej is the Polish form of the given name Andrew.

Notable individuals with the given name Andrzej

 Andrzej Bartkowiak (born 1950), Polish film director and cinematographer
 Andrzej Bobola, S.J. (1591–1657), Polish saint, missionary and martyr
 Andrzej Chyra (born 1964), Polish actor
 Andrzej Czarniak (1931–1985), Polish alpine skier
 Andrzej Duda (born 1972), Polish 6th president
 Andrzej Jajszczyk, Polish scientist
 Andrzej Kmicic, fictional protagonist of Henryk Sienkiewicz's novel The Deluge
 Andrzej Kokowski (born 1953), Polish archaeologist
 Andrzej Krauze (born 1947), Polish-British cartoonist and illustrator
 Andrzej Leder (born 1960), Polish philosopher and psychotherapist
 Andrzej Mazurczak (born 1993), Polish basketball player
 Andrzej Mleczko (born 1949), Polish illustrator
 Andrzej Nowacki (born 1953), Polish artist 
 Andrzej Paczkowski (born 1938), Polish historian
 Sir Andrzej Panufnik (1914–1991), Polish composer
 Andrzej Person, Polish sports journalist and politician
 Andrzej Piaseczny (born 1971), Polish singer, songwriter, actor, and television personality
 Andrzej Sapkowski (born 1948), Polish fantasy writer
 Andrzej Sekuła (born 1954), Polish cinematographer and film director
 Andrzej Skowroński (1953–2020), Polish rower
 Andrzej Strzelecki (1952–2020), Polish film and theatre actor
 Andrzej Tomaszewicz (1943–2020), Polish politician
 Andrzej Wajda (1926–2016), Polish film director
 Andrzej Załuski (1695–1758), Polish bishop

Polish masculine given names